Isthmiade laevicollis is a species of beetle in the family Cerambycidae. It was described by Tippmann in 1953.

References

Isthmiade
Beetles described in 1953